Carolus Stoffels (4 October 1893 – 21 October 1957) was a Dutch modern pentathlete. He competed at the 1924 Summer Olympics.

References

External links
 

1893 births
1957 deaths
Dutch male modern pentathletes
Olympic modern pentathletes of the Netherlands
Modern pentathletes at the 1924 Summer Olympics
Sportspeople from The Hague